Panduranga or Prangdarang was a Cham Principality and later, the rump state successor of the Champa kingdom, which was destroyed by Vietnamese emperor Le Thanh Tong in 1471. It was located in present-day Southcentral Vietnam. It stood until late 17th century as the Nguyen lords of Cochinchina, a powerful Vietnamese clan, vassalized it and put the Cham polity under the name Principality of Thuận Thành.

History

Preface
Previously, Pänduranga (known to medieval Chinese sources as Bīn Tónglóng or Bēntuólàng 奔陀浪洲) was an autonomous princedom inside Champa. From the 13th century onward, it had been ruled by local dynasties that relatively independent from the court of the king of kings at Vijaya, central Champa.

Panduranga had its own revolt against the court of king Jaya Paramesvaravarman I (r. 1044–1060) in 1050. In contrast with scholars who view Champa as the kingdom exclusively of the Cham, recent scholars such as Po Dharma and Richard O’Connor, rebrand Champa as a multiethnic kingdom. They note that Champa was highly likely a coalition of the Cham lowlanders and the indigenous inhabitants of the Central Highlands, although Cham culture is usually associated with the broader culture of Champa.

Early period
From 1060 to 1074, Panduranga was the capital of king Rudravarman III (r. 1061–1074). During the 12th century when Khmer Empire invaded Champa and occupied most of the kingdom in 1145–1150, prince Sivänandana or Jaya Harivarman I (r. 1147–1162), son of refugee king Rudravarman IV, fled to Panduranga, then led a rebellion that resisted the Khmer and inflicted defeats on the invaders, forcing them to make a withdrawal in 1149. In 1151, province of Amaravarti (Quảng Ngãi province) revolted against Harivarman, followed by Panduranga in 1155. In 1190, Cham Prince Vidyanandana (r. 1192–1203) who had defected to the Khmer was nominated as puppet king of Pänduranga. Revolts ousted Khmer Prince In of Vijaya in 1191, which prompted Vidyanandana to rebel against the Khmer in 1192 and then reunified Champa. He faced massive retribution from Jayavarman VII of Angkor in the next year, but Vidyanandana's struggle for Champa lasted until 1203 when the capital of Vijaya fell to the Khmer and Vidyanandana himself fled and died in Dai Viet. 

According to the Sakarai dak rai patao (Panduranga annals), the first king of Panduranga Principality was Sri Aragang. His rule lasted between 1195/1205 to 1235/1247. The king of kings at Vijaya still wrested certain suzerainty over Panduranga. Sri Aragang was succeeded by Cei Anâk, who reigned between 1235/1247 - 1269/1281. After the Aragang dynasty, Panduranga continued maintaining its sovereignty under the Dobatasuar dynasty (1269-1373). 

By the late 14th century, the whole of Champa had been unified again under the rule of a single strong dynasty, founded by Jaya Simhavarman VI (r. 1390–1400). Panduranga remained autonomous but asymmetrical and maintained a tributary relationship with the Simhavarmanids in Vijaya.

Collapse of Vijaya and the beginning of Panduranga period
When the Vietnamese under Le Thanh Tong attacked Champa in early 1471, the whole northern part of the kingdom was razed, cities ransacked, and tens of thousand people were killed, either massacred or enslaved by the invaders. The Vietnamese king also captured the Cham king Tra Toan and Vijaya clansmen, deporting them to the north, ending the dynasty's reign. This event is widely recognized as the end of the Champa Kingdom, according to Georges Maspero's logics. However, it is noteworthy to know that the fall of Vijaya was not a "shift" of Champa power to the south or the end of the kingdom, but rather, reflects the multicentric nature of Champa, a confederation of semiindependent kingdoms which now were no longer under the prestige of the Vijaya king of kings.

Unsurprisingly, a massive wave of Cham emigration radiated across Southeast Asia: In Cambodia, Cham refugees were welcomed, but the sources do not provide how they arrived in Cambodia and where they settled. In Thailand, there were records of Cham presence since Ayudhaya period. In the Malay archipelago, the Sejarah Melayu (Malay Annals) states that after the collapse of Vijaya in 1471, two Cham princes named Indera Berma Shah and Shah Palembang sought asylum in Melaka and Aceh. Shortly after his conversion to Islam, Indera Berma Shah was appointed minister at the court of Sultan Mansur Shah. The Sejarah Melayu also mentions Cham presences in Pahang, Kelantan, where the Kampung Laut Mosque is said to be built by Champa sailors, on their way to Java and Aceh.

According to Vietnamese sources, on 22 March 1471, after the loss of the capital Vijaya to the Vietnamese force under Le Thanh Tong, a Cham general named Bố Trì Trì (T'chai Ya Ma Fou Ngan in Chinese annals) fled to Panduranga's capital Pa Rang and set up his own rule and submitted to Le Thanh Tong seven days later. Thanh Tong agreed, but he divided the Cham remnants into three smaller polities: Kauthara, Panduranga, and the northern part of Central Highlands. Champa was reduced in six regions: Aia Ru (Phú Yên), Aia Trang (Khánh Hòa), Panrang (Phan Rang), Kraong (Long Hương), Parik (Phan Rí Cửa) and Pajai. The Chinese Ming Shilu provides another deviation of the timeline: Although the Vietnamese sacking of Vijaya in March 1471, T'chai Ya Ma Fou Ngan still facilitated token diplomacy with Ming Empire in unoccassional years, in 1478, 1505, and 1515, the son of Fou Ngan received succession prescription from the Ming; their last contact occurred in 1543.

According to the Cham annal, from 1421/1448 to 1567/1579, the capital of Panduranga was Biuh Bal Batsinâng. From 1567/1579 to 1653, it had been relocated to Bal Pangdarang (present day Phan Rang). From the late 17th century until 1832, the capital of Panduranga was once again moved south to Phan Rí Cửa.

The Cham stopped paying tribute to the Viet court when the Le was usurped by the Mac dynasty in 1526.

Revival

During the sixteenth century, as Dai Viet fragmented in the north, Panduranga Champa again gained prosper from the rise of the international trade. Throughout the seventeenth century, Cham merchants traded actively in Siam, Manila, Macao, Malacca, Johor, Pahang, Patani, and Makassar. A Spanish record reported that "many Muslims live in Champa, whose Hindu king wanted Islam to be spoken and taught, resulted in many mosques existed along with Hindu temples.

In 1578, Panduranga assaulted Nguyen lord's domain near Đà Rằng River. In 1594, Panduranga king sent a fleet of 400 warships to aid the Johor Sultanate in its struggles against the Portuguese in Melaka. 

Panduranga also helped its neighbor Cambodia during the Cambodian–Spanish War, which resulted in delivering a fiasco to the Spanish conquistadors. Governor of Malina, Luis Pérez Dasmariñas (fl. 1593–96) sent a letter to the court of king Philip II in late 1595, antagonizing the Cham king as "a vicious dangerous tyrant who was treacherous and full of evil deeds," while his second letter suggested that just around 200–300 Spanish soldiers and 500 local mercenaries would be needed to conquer Champa. During that time, the Cham were remembered by Spanish, Portuguese, and Dutch merchants and seamen as ferocious pirates of the South China Sea who numerously boarded merchant ships, plundering cargos, kidnapping crew members, and routinely took European hostages to slavery. Cham kings were described to be at least involved or actively encouraging raids against foreign ships.

In 1611, in an attempt to retake land from the Nguyen lord, Champa mounted an attack in Phu Yen, but gained no success, and the Kauthara principality was lost to the Nguyen after a counterattack.

Later period under Po Rome dynasty

With the rise of nearby Hội An, most foreign traders now were leaving Champa. Japanese seal trade ships ceased to trade with Champa in 1623. In 1611, lord Nguyen Phuc Nguyen sent an army led by Văn Phong, a Cham defector, attacking Panduranga, annexing the entire Kauthara Principality. Nguyen lord then resettled 30,000 Trinh POWs in Phu Yen. 

Notable Cham king of this period, Po Rome (r. 1627-1651), was known for his great erudition of Islam after having a sojourn study in Kelantan, Malay Peninsula, and the mass conversion to Islam by his people. He encouraged trade, granting the Dutch permission to arrange free trade in his country unless they do not attack Portuguese merchants at his ports. To resolve discontents between Muslims and Balamon, Po Rome ordered the Cham Bani to have their religion more integrated with Cham customs and beliefs, while pressing the Ahier to accept Allah as the most supreme God but allowed them to retain their worships of traditional Cham divinities, excellently reforging peace and cohesion in his kingdom. King Po Rome is an important deity that is being venerated by the Cham people today. Connections between Pandaranga and the extra Malay/Islamic world blossomed. Syncretism was widely practiced at all levels, best known for incorporating cosmopolitan Islamic doctrines into existing indigenous Cham beliefs and Hindu pantheons. The multipurpose lunisolar sakawi calendar, was likely Po Rome's best combination of previous Cham Śaka era with the Islamic lunar calendar. 

European missionaries described Champa in the 1670s as having the majority of its population being Muslims, a Muslim sultan, and a Muslim court. In 1680 Panduranga king Po Saut (r. 1659–1692) styled himself with Malay horrific Paduka Seri Sultan in his hand letter to the Dutch in Java. In 1686, the Cham and Malay Muslim communities in Siam reportedly joined the Makassars rebellion against king Narai of Ayudhya.

Under Po Rome's dynasty, Panduranga suffered several incursions from the Southern Vietnamese Nguyen kingdom which centered around trading centers Hue-Hoi An, the old center region of Champa which had been recently Vietnamized. Lords Nguyễn Phúc Nguyên, Nguyễn Phúc Tần, and Nguyễn Phúc Chu repeatedly invaded Panduranga in 1611, 1629, 1653, 1692. During the late 16th and early 17th centuries, the Nguyen of Cochinchina were too preoccupied dealing with their northern enemies, the Trịnh, rather than with the Cham. Though was not recorded in official chronicles, but in dynastic genealogy and pseudonymous Cham sources, in 1631 Nguyễn Phúc Nguyên arranged the marriage of his princess Nguyễn Phúc Ngọc Khoa to king Po Rome. Alexander de Rhodes describes sometime in 1639, the Nguyen still placed several galleys in the port of Ran Ran (Phú Yên) to prevent seaborne incursion from Champa.

Having successfully fended off the Trinh, the Nguyen thalassocracy turned its attention to the south, dispatching their first interference in Cambodia, overthrowing its first and only Muslim king Ramathipadi I in 1658. The Nguyen had periodically invaded Cambodia several times from 1658 to 1692 on par with Siam. In 1682, Panduranga reportedly sent envoys led by the king's brothers who had fled after the king's coronation to Ayudhya in a possible search for Siamese protection. 

In 1692, lord Nguyễn Phúc Chu invaded Panduranga, arresting King Po Saut and renaming Panduranga to Trấn Thuận Thành (Principality of Thuận Thành). The lord established Bình Thuận District inside the Principality as free lands for ethnic Viet settler colonialism, but Cham revolts in 1693–96 forced the Nguyen lord to mitigate the resentment by abolishing the Binh Thuan county, restoring the Cham monarchy with full rights, however, becoming a vassal of the Nguyen, according to a following treaty signed in 1712. In 1694 Panduranga king Po Saktiraydapatih (r. 1695–1727) received the title King of Thuan Thanh. From 1695 onward, Panduranga had been reduced to a client state of the Nguyen domain, known as the Principality of Thuận Thành (Trấn Thuận Thành – Principality of 'Submissive Citadel').

Society
During the 16th century, Cham merchants renewed their commercial links and actively traded in Siam, Manila, Macao, Malacca, Johor, Pahang, Patani, and Makassar. Among their exports, Cham textile was famously consumed.

The 17th-century Chinese compendium Xiyang Chao Gong Dian Lu (Tributes from the countries of the Western Sea,  1650) describes a type of Cham brewed liquor that is made from cooked rice, mixed with wine and medicines, contained in pottery, and is drunk by long bamboo straws. People would sit around the container and take sips.

Proselytization of Islam increased sharply after the fall of Vijaya, as missionary Gabriel de San Antonio wrote a description in 1585: "The locals (Chams) hated the Castilians and believed prophecies made by the Moro, that there would be a king Mahoma, and many would embrace the new faith." 

Currently, there are two theories among academic consensus regard the apostle of Islam to Champa, proposed by scholars Antoine Cabaton and Pierre-Yves Manguin. The first theory states that Islam could have been introduced by Arab, Persian, Indian merchants, scholars, religious leaders, during from the 10th to 14th century. The second theory argues that Islam arrived in Champa through a later, shorter, indirectly way from the Malays (jawa, melayu, chvea), according to Manguin, is more convincing and valid. Most historians agree that the Cham only began converting to Islam en masse after the destruction of Vijaya. In his conclusion, Manguin attributes the Islamization of the Cham people to their active participation in the regional maritime networks, and the Malay states and Malay traders which also contributed great impacts to the process.

References

Citations

Bibliography

 
 
 
 
 
 
 
  
 
 
 
 
 
 
 

History of Champa
Former countries in Southeast Asia
Former countries in Vietnamese history
1471 establishments
1697 disestablishments